William Henry Regnery (October 12, 1877 – January 16, 1954) was a businessman and manufacturer in the United States.

Background
William H. Regnery was born in Sheboygan, Wisconsin, on October 12, 1877. His father, Wilhelm, immigrated to the United States from Ensch, Germany, and the family of his mother, Johanna ( Jung), had been in the country one generation longer. The family moved to St. Lucas, Iowa, when he was very young. The family was Roman Catholic.

Career

Business

Regnery had a successful career in business and manufacturing. In 1936, he was heading the Western Shade Cloth Company, based in Chicago.

Politics
In his youth, Regnery attached himself to a variety of social reform movements and was particularly devoted to the ideas of Henry George.

Regnery supported Franklin Roosevelt in the U.S. presidential elections of 1932 and 1936. In the 1936 election, during a radio broadcast sponsored by the Democratic National Committee, he said: "It is my firm and honest belief that we are in the prosperous and enviable position we occupy today as a direct result of the policies which his administration put into operation to rescue the industrial and agricultural populations of our country from disaster and ruin."

He grew estranged from the New Deal in the late 1930s, objecting both to the growth of the government's role in the domestic economy and Roosevelt's internationalism that indicated the U.S. could intervene in a European military conflict.

He was among the founders of the America First Committee, attending one of its organizing sessions in Chicago along with General Robert E. Wood and Alice Roosevelt Longworth. He served on its National Committee and helped finance it as well.

Following World War II, he was the principal source of financial support for the Foundation for Foreign Affairs, a research and public education enterprise formed to promote a policy of non-intervention and support for German redevelopment rather than European-wide assistance.

Personal life and death
Regnery married Francis Susan Thrasher, a descendant of older Pennsylvania and Maryland stock, in Kansas City on June 30, 1903. He was the father of conservative publisher Henry Regnery (1912–1996) and grandfather of white supremacist William Regnery II (1941-2021).  Grandchildren include Alfred S. Regnery.

Regnery died on January 16, 1954.

See also
 America First Committee
 Henry Regnery 
 William Regnery II 
 Alfred S. Regnery

References

Further reading
 Henry H. Regnery, William H. Regnery and His Family (1981)

1877 births
1954 deaths
American people of German descent
People from Sheboygan, Wisconsin
Regnery family